The Naked Man may refer to:

 The Naked Man (book), a book of cultural anthropology by Claude Lévi-Strauss
 The Naked Man: A Study of the Male Body, a book by the anthropologist Desmond Morris
 The Naked Man (1923 film), a British film
 The Naked Man (1998 film), a comedy film
 "The Naked Man" (How I Met Your Mother), a 2008 episode of the television show How I Met Your Mother
 Well Hung Lover, a.k.a. Naked Man, a mural by Banksy

See also
 Andrew Martinez, a.k.a. "Naked Guy"
 Naked fugitive, an unidentified young man briefly mentioned in the Gospel of Mark